This article displays the qualifying draw of the 2011 Legg Mason Tennis Classic.

Players

Seeds

Qualifiers

Lucky losers
  Wayne Odesnik

Qualifying draw

First qualifier

Second qualifier

Third qualifier

Fourth qualifier

Fifth qualifier

Sixth qualifier

References
 Qualifying Draw

Legg Mason Tennis Classic - Qualifying
Qualification for tennis tournaments